David Barnes may refer to:

 Dave Barnes (born 1978), American singer-songwriter
 David Barnes (archer) (born 1986), Australian archer
 David Barnes (boxer) (born 1981), British boxer
 David Barnes (cricketer) (born 1982), English cricketer
 David Barnes (footballer) (born 1961), English footballer
 David Barnes (politician) (1894–1970), New Zealand politician
 David Barnes (rugby union) (born 1976), English rugby union player
 David Barnes (sailor) (born 1958), New Zealand America's Cup sailor
 David L. Barnes (1760–1812), U.S. District Court of Rhode Island judge and party in 1791 case, West v. Barnes
 David S. Barnes, American historian of science
 David Wilson Barnes (born 1972), American actor